Trident Technical College (TTC) is a public community college with its main campus in Charleston, South Carolina and other campuses throughout Berkeley, Charleston, and Dorchester counties. It is part of the South Carolina Technical College System. Enrollment for each semester is approximately 12,000 students working their way toward college transfer associate degrees and technical associate degrees, diplomas, and certificates.

History 

Trident Technical College was formed in 1973 from the merger of the Berkeley-Charleston-Dorchester Technical Education Center and Palmer College.

Locations 

Thornley Campus - 7000 Rivers Ave., North Charleston, SC 29406

Mount Pleasant Campus - 1125 John Dilligard Lane, Mount Pleasant, SC 29464

Palmer Campus - 66 Columbus St., Charleston, SC 29403

Berkeley Campus - 1001 S. Live Oak Drive, Moncks Corner, SC 29461

St. Paul's Parish Site - 5231 Highway 165, Hollywood, SC 29449

Dorchester County QuickJobs Training Center - 5164 E. Jim Bilton Boulevard, St. George, SC 29477

References 
 Trident Technical College. 2019-20 Catalog: Trident Technical College

External links 
 Official website

Education in Charleston County, South Carolina
Education in Dorchester County, South Carolina
Education in Berkeley County, South Carolina
Buildings and structures in Charleston County, South Carolina
Buildings and structures in Dorchester County, South Carolina
Buildings and structures in Berkeley County, South Carolina
Educational institutions established in 1973
Universities and colleges accredited by the Southern Association of Colleges and Schools
Education in Charleston, South Carolina
Education in North Charleston, South Carolina
South Carolina Technical College System
1973 establishments in South Carolina